The 2005 Thailand Open was a tennis tournament played on indoor hard courts. It was the 3rd edition of the Thailand Open, and was part of the International Series of the 2005 ATP Tour. It took place at the Impact Arena in Bangkok, Thailand, from September 26 through October 2, 2005. Paul Hanley and Leander Paes won in the final 5–6(5–7), 6–1, 6–2, against Jonathan Erlich and Andy Ram

Seeds

Draw

Finals

References

Doubles
Thailand Open - Doubles
 in Thai tennis